This is a list of people who have served as Lord Lieutenant of Tweeddale. The office replaced the Lord Lieutenant of Peeblesshire in 1975.

Scott had been Lord Lieutenant of Peeblesshire
Sir Robert Scott 1975–1980
Lt-Col. Aidan Sprot 8 October 1980 – 1994
Capt. Sir John David Bingham Younger, KCVO 28 June 1994 – 20 May 2014
Sir Hew Strachan 20 May 2014 – present

References